Pascual de Aragón y Córdoba (1626 – 28 September 1677) was a Spanish nobleman and cleric. He served as Viceroy of Naples and as Archbishop of Toledo.

Biography
Born in Mataró, Province of Barcelona, as son of Enrique de Aragón Folc de Cardona y Córdoba, Aragón was ordained a priest in 1655. In 1661, aged thirty-five, he was created Cardinal-Priest of Sainte Balbine by Pope Alexander VII. However, he did not participate in the Conclaves held in his lifetime.

In 1664, King Philip IV of Spain appointed him Viceroy of Naples. In 1666, he was replaced by his brother, Pedro Antonio de Aragón, as he was called back to Spain to become Archbishop of Toledo. Aragón had enjoyed the patronage of the previous Archbishop, Baltasar Moscoso y Sandoval, and upon the latter's death in 1665 had been nominated to succeed him. He was installed in Toledo on 1 February 1666.

In 1665, King Philip IV had died as well, leaving the throne to his son Charles II, a weak four-year-old. Upon his appointment as Archbishop, Aragón became president of the Regency Council. When Queen Mariana of Austria promoted her confessor and former tutor, the Austrian Jesuit Juan Everardo Nithard to the position of General Inquisitor in 1666 and thus admitted him to the council, Archbishop Aragón was among those who antagonised him and in 1669 supported John of Austria's military pronunciamiento, which resulted in the Jesuit's dismissal.

The Archbishop died in 1677 and was buried in the Convent of the Purísima Concepción in Toledo.

References

External links
https://web.archive.org/web/20091122183702/http://www.grandesp.org.uk/historia/gzas/aragonpedroant.htm 
https://web.archive.org/web/20100322223156/http://www.tercios.org/personajes/aragon_pedro.html

1626 births
1677 deaths
People from Mataró
Burials in the Province of Toledo
Viceroys of Naples
Archbishops of Toledo
Cardinals created by Pope Alexander VII
17th-century Roman Catholic archbishops in Spain
Grand Inquisitors of Spain
University of Salamanca alumni